The Columbia River redband trout, the inland redband trout or the interior redband trout (Oncorhynchus mykiss gairdneri) is one of three redband trout subspecies of the rainbow trout in the family Salmonidae. It is native in the Columbia River and its tributaries in Idaho, Oregon, Washington and Montana. It includes sea-run anadromous forms, which are known as redband steelhead. Also the large Kamloops rainbow trout is included.

References

Oncorhynchus
Columbia River
Trout, Columbia
Trout, Columbia
Trout, Columbia
Trout, Columbia
Natural history of Idaho
Natural history of Montana
Natural history of Oregon
Natural history of Washington (state)